"Fraulein" is a 1957 song written by Lawton Williams and sung by Bobby Helms. Released by Decca Records that year, "Fraulein" was Helms's debut single on the U.S. country chart, reaching #1 for four weeks and staying on chart for 52 weeks, the sixth longest song in country music history to spend over 50 weeks on the country singles chart. The song's popularity crossed over to the pop chart where "Fraulein" peaked at #36.

Country artist Hank Locklin recorded a shorter version of the song that is included on his 1965 album, Once Over Lightly.

Willie Nelson recorded and released a version of the song on his 1966 album, Country Favorites - Willie Nelson Style.

David Allan Coe recorded and released a version on his 1975 album, Once Upon a Rhyme.

In 1967, this song was covered by the late Singaporean singer/songwriter/lyricist Su Yin (舒雲) in Mandarin Chinese language with Chinese lyrics written by Li Tian (黎天) and given the title name of 夜茫茫, appearing on his LP album 黃昏放牛＊一片青青的草地, and released by EMI Columbia Records.

Jerry Lee Lewis released a version on his 1969 album, Sings the Country Music Hall of Fame Hits, Vol. 2. Townes Van Zandt covered the song on his 1972 album The Late Great Townes Van Zandt. In 1974, Mickey Gilley also covered the song and released it on his album City Lights.

Philippine singer Victor Wood covered this song in 1967 on the album Memories.

Country music singer and Decca labelmate Kitty Wells recorded a response to the song, "(I'll Always Be Your) Fraulein" in 1957. It reached #10 on the country charts that year. "(I'll Always Be Your) Fraulein" appears in her 1959 album Kitty Wells' Golden Favorites.

Helms himself recorded his own follow-up song in 1960, entitled "Lonely River Rhine". The lyrics reveal a darker side of the singer: he had had a wife all along, but "stole love" from a local girl when in Munich, only to later leave her and much later learn from the newspapers that she had committed suicide by drowning herself in the Rhine, and he learned that the deceased was the one whom he truly loved.

In 2017, singer/songwriter Colter Wall released a version on his self-titled album, Colter Wall.  In this duet version, he is joined by fellow traditional country music artist, Tyler Childers.

The melody of the song is largely borrowed from "Oklahoma Hills" by Woody Guthrie, which was recorded as a hit song in 1945 by his cousin Jack Guthrie.

Charts

References

1957 singles
Bobby Helms songs
Jerry Lee Lewis songs
Songs written by Lawton Williams
1957 songs